Orchestra Sinfonica di Roma is an orchestra based in Rome. It was established in 2002, and is conducted by Francesco La Vecchia.

References

External links
Official site 

Musical groups established in 2002
2002 establishments in Italy
Musical groups from Rome
Italian orchestras